Eraserheads: The Singles is a compilation album by Filipino alternative rock band Eraserheads. It was released in 2001 by Musiko Records & BMG Records (Pilipinas), Inc. as part of the label's "Himig Ng Dekada 90" series featuring compilation albums from bands such as Rivermaya, Color It Red, Yano and Francis Magalona. The compilation features the band's singles from four of their studio albums, as well as non-album track "Harana" and a cover of "Tuwing Umuulan at Kapiling Ka" by Basil Valdez.

Track listing

References

2001 compilation albums
Eraserheads albums